The Sobat River is a river of the Greater Upper Nile region in northeastern South Sudan, Africa. It is the most southerly of the great eastern tributaries of the White Nile, before the confluence with the Blue Nile.

Geography
The Sobat River is formed by the confluence of the west-flowing Baro River and the north-flowing Pibor River, on the border with Ethiopia. The river enters the White Nile at Doleib Hill, near the city of Malakal in Upper Nile State.

When in flood the Sobat River produces an enormous discharge carrying a white sediment, which gives the White Nile its name.

Hydrology
The river's mean annual discharge is 412 m³/s (14,550 ft³/s).

See also
List of rivers of South Sudan

References

External links

 

 
Rivers of South Sudan
Tributaries of the Nile
Upper Nile (state)
Greater Upper Nile
Nile basin